is a train station in Izumo, Shimane Prefecture, Japan. It is on the Kita-Matsue Line, operated by the Ichibata Electric Railway. All services stop at this station.

The Kita-Matsue Line previously extended northwards to Ichibata Yakushi, a Shinto shrine. However, this section of rail was closed in 1944 and disassembled in 1960 due to it being designated as an "unnecessary railway", making this station a switchback.

Lines
 Ichibata Electric Railway
 Kita-Matsue Line

Adjacent stations

|-
!colspan=5|Ichibata Electric Railway

References

Bataden Kita-Matsue Line
Railway stations in Shimane Prefecture
Railway stations in Japan opened in 1915